Eloise Randolph Page (February 19, 1920 – October 16, 2002) was an American Central Intelligence Agency (CIA) officer. She was the first female officer in several agency roles.

Early life 
Page was born and grew up in Richmond, Virginia. She learned piano as a child and originally hoped to be a professional musician.

Education 
Page attended Hollins College and earned a Master's Degree in Political Science from George Washington University.

Career 
Upon graduation, Page worked for the British War Relief Society.

Page began her US intelligence work during World War II in May 1942, working under William J. Donovan, head of the CIA's predecessor, the Office of Strategic Services. She became interested in intelligence work and espionage, and continued into the CIA when it was formed in 1947. She progressed to a senior role with the Agency, becoming the CIA's first female station chief in 1978. She was stationed in Athens, Greece, where the previous chief, Richard Welch, had been assassinated three years earlier. She subsequently became the first female Deputy Director of the Intelligence Community staff and chaired the Critical Collection Problems Committee. Within the CIA, she became a well-respected terrorism expert.

In 1987, Page retired, receiving the Distinguished Intelligence Medal. She had been the highest ranking female officer in the CIA since 1975. Following retirement, she continued consulting with the Defense Intelligence Agency on terrorism, and taught at the National Defense University. In 1997, she was one of 50 CIA officers who received a Trailblazer Award for service. Her Trailblazer citation called her "a role model" and "a champion of using technology to solve operational problems".

Page died on October 16, 2002, having never married and without children.

Legacy 
During her tenure at the CIA, Page was known for being a "proper Southern woman", wearing white gloves and regularly teaching Sunday school at the Christ Episcopal Church in Georgetown. She was nicknamed the "Iron Butterfly". Though colleagues remembered her as a genteel woman, she could be fierce and demanding when her role required. Her official ID badge is held in the CIA Museum.

References 

1920 births
2002 deaths
People from Richmond, Virginia
Hollins University alumni
Columbian College of Arts and Sciences alumni
People of the Office of Strategic Services
People of the Central Intelligence Agency
Recipients of the Distinguished Intelligence Medal
National Defense University faculty
American expatriates in Greece